The Pelican Brief is a 1993 American legal thriller film based on the 1992 novel by John Grisham. Directed by Alan J. Pakula, the film stars Julia Roberts in the role of young law student Darby Shaw and Denzel Washington as Washington Herald reporter Gray Grantham. The film, which features music composed by James Horner, was the last film that featured Pakula as both writer and director before his death.

Plot
After an assassin named Khamel kills two Supreme Court justices, Jensen and Rosenberg, Tulane University law student Darby Shaw writes a legal brief detailing her theory on why they were killed. She gives the brief to her law professor and lover Thomas Callahan, a former clerk of Rosenberg's, who in turn gives a copy to his good friend Gavin Verheek, special counsel to the Director of the FBI. Soon after, a car bomb kills Callahan. Darby, who refused to ride with the inebriated Callahan, narrowly avoided the same fate. Now realizing that her brief was accurate, she goes into hiding and reaches out to Verheek for assistance.

An informant calling himself Garcia contacts Washington Herald reporter Gray Grantham with information about the assassinations, but disappears. Darby also contacts Grantham, who verifies her information as accurate. Darby's computer, disks, and files disappear from her home. She is attacked at the hotel where she is hiding. She escapes unharmed, but scared. She contacts and agrees to meet Verheek, but Khamel kills Verheek and impersonates him at the meeting. Before Khamel can kill Darby, an unknown person shoots and kills him.

Darby agrees to meet Grantham in New York City, where she shares the theory expressed in her brief: the assassinations were done for oil tycoon Victor Mattiece, who intends to exploit the oil he found beneath Louisiana marshland that is habitat for an endangered sub-species of brown pelicans. A court appeal to deny Mattiece the drilling rights is expected to reach the Supreme Court. Darby has surmised that Mattiece, hoping to turn the case in his favor, is behind the justices' murders; these two justices had differing opinions on most everything except protecting the environment. As a generous contributor to the President, Mattiece expects he would appoint justices that favor oil and gas exploitation over environmental issues while the next president may not do so. When Grantham tells her about Garcia, they discover that the man is Curtis Morgan, a lawyer in the oil and gas division at the Washington, D.C. law firm of White & Blazevich.

Darby visits the firm, pretending to have an appointment with Morgan, and is told that he was killed in a mugging. Suspecting that his murder was related to the incriminating information, she and Grantham visit his widow, who gives them a key to a safe deposit box. Darby visits the bank to retrieve the contents of the box. After barely escaping death via a car bomb, they reach the Washington Herald building, where they review the documents and a videotape recovered from Morgan's box. The tape corroborates Darby's theory, as Morgan's documents verify that Mattiece ordered the Justices to be assassinated. With this evidence, Grantham writes his story. He gives the FBI a chance to comment and FBI Director Voyles confirms that Darby's "Pelican Brief" was delivered to the White House. He reveals the President ordered the FBI to "back off," and that the CIA is investigating Mattiece, with one of them killing Khamel to save Darby's life. A plane that the FBI arranges for Darby flies her away to safety under the United States Federal Witness Protection Program.

Sometime later, Darby watches a TV interview of Grantham where it is revealed that Mattiece and four of his aides and lawyers have been indicted, the President's chief of staff Fletcher Coal has resigned, and the President (who received $4.2million in contributions from Mattiece) is unlikely to run for reelection. Grantham deflects speculation that Darby is fictional, but does agree that she is "almost" too good to be true, causing Darby to smile.

Cast

 Julia Roberts as Darby Shaw
 Denzel Washington as Gray Grantham
 Sam Shepard as Thomas Callahan
 John Heard as Gavin Verheek
 Tony Goldwyn as Fletcher Coal
 James Sikking as FBI Director Denton Voyles
 John Finn as Matthew Barr
 William Atherton as Bob Gminski
 Robert Culp as The President
 Stanley Tucci as Khamel
 Hume Cronyn as Justice Rosenberg
 John Lithgow as Smith Keen
 Anthony Heald as Marty Velmano
 Cynthia Nixon as Alice Stark
 Jake Weber as Curtis Morgan / Garcia
 Ralph Cosham as Justice Jensen
 Casey Biggs as Eric East
 Stanley Anderson as Edwin Sneller
 Christopher Murray as Rupert

Reception

Box office
The Pelican Brief grossed $100.8million in the United States and Canada, and $94.5million in other territories, for a worldwide total of $195.3million, against a production budget of $45million.

Critical response
On Rotten Tomatoes, the film has an approval rating of 54% based on 54 reviews, with an average rating of 5.5/10. The site's consensus states: "Julia Roberts and Denzel Washington are a compelling team in the overlong Pelican Brief, a pulpy thriller that doesn't quite justify the intellectual remove of Alan J. Pakula's direction." On Metacritic, the film has a weighted average score of 50 out of 100, based on 15 critics, indicating "mixed or average reviews". Audiences polled by CinemaScore gave the film an average grade of "B+" on an A+ to F scale.

Pat Collins, from WWOR-TV, said that the film was "A heart-stopping, spine-chilling, adrenaline-pumping, run-for-your-life thriller." In The Chicago Sun-Times, Roger Ebert gave it 3 out of a possible 4 stars, writing "the movie delivers while it's onscreen" but also believed The Pelican Brief was inferior to the film adaptation of Grisham's The Firm (also 1993) and ranked as one of Pakula's lesser efforts. 
Film critic Brian Lowry of Variety wrote in his review: Pakula does a remarkable job in weaving and making sense of these complex strands. Although there's plenty of suspense as Darby and Gray evade her pursuers, the director eschews the cheaper tricks of the trade, respecting the audience's ability to keep track of what's going on. Also, Brief is a relatively gore-free thriller, with most of the violence effectively conveyed offscreen.

Film critic Janet Maslin of The New York Times wrote in her review: 
The Pelican Brief is best watched as a celebration of liquid brown eyes and serious star quality, thanks to the casting of Ms. Roberts and Denzel Washington in its leading roles. Neither of these first-rate actors is shown to great dramatic advantage, but they both do a lot to make the movie shine.

Home video
The Pelican Brief was released on VHS on June 15, 1994, by Warner Home Video. The film was released on Blu-ray on February 10, 2009, by Warner Home Video. The Pelican Brief was released on DVD on September 7, 2010, by Warner Home Video.

References

External links

 
 
 
 
 

1990s legal films
1993 thriller films
1993 films
American legal films
American political thriller films
1990s English-language films
Environmental films
Films about journalists
Films based on thriller novels
Films based on works by John Grisham
Films directed by Alan J. Pakula
Films scored by James Horner
Films set in New Orleans
Films set in Washington, D.C.
Legal thriller films
Tulane University Law School
Warner Bros. films
Films set in a movie theatre
1990s American films